The Rural Municipality of Bone Creek No. 108 is a rural municipality (RM) in the Canadian province of Saskatchewan within Census Division No. 4 and  Division No. 3. It is located in the southwest portion of the province.

History 
The RM of Bone Creek No. 108 incorporated as a rural municipality on December 11, 1911.

Geography

Communities and localities 
The following unincorporated communities are located in the RM of Bone Creek No. 108.

Hamlets
Simmie

Localities
Illerbrun
Instow, former seat of municipality, dissolved as a village, December 31, 1953.
Scotsguard, former seat of municipality, dissolved as a village, December 31, 1951.

Demographics 

Government 
The RM of Bone Creek No. 108 is governed by an elected municipal council and an appointed administrator that meets on the second Wednesday of every month. The reeve of the RM is Mel Larson while its administrator is Lana Bavle. The RM's office is located in Shaunavon.

Transportation 
Roads
Highway 13—serves Instow, Saskatchewan  Scotsguard, Saskatchewan
Highway 631—serves Scotsguard, Saskatchewan  Simmie, Saskatchewan
Highway 343—serves Simmie, Saskatchewan

See also 
List of rural municipalities in Saskatchewan

References 

B

Division No. 4, Saskatchewan